Aditya L1 is a planned coronagraphy spacecraft to study solar atmosphere, currently being designed and developed by the Indian Space Research Organisation (ISRO) and various other Indian research institutes. It will be inserted in a halo orbit around the L1 point between the Earth and the Sun where it will study the solar atmosphere, solar magnetic storms and its impact on environment around Earth.

Key scientific objectives are coronal heating, solar wind acceleration, coronal magnetometry, origin and monitoring of near-UV solar radiation and the continuous observation of photosphere, chromosphere and corona, solar energetic particles and magnetic field of the Sun.

It is the first Indian mission dedicated to observe the Sun, and is planned to be launched in June-July 2023 aboard a PSLV-XL launch vehicle.

History 
Aditya was conceptualised in January 2008 by the Advisory Committee for Space Research. It was initially envisaged as a small , LEO(800 km) satellite with a coronagraph to study the solar corona. An experimental budget of 3 Crore INR was allocated for the financial year 2016–2017. The scope of the mission has since been expanded and it is now planned to be a comprehensive solar and space environment observatory to be placed at the Lagrange point L1, so the mission was renamed "Aditya-L1". , the mission has an allocated cost of ₹378.53 crore excluding launch costs.

Overview 

The  satellite carries seven science payloads with diverse objectives, including but not limited to, the coronal heating, solar wind acceleration, coronal magnetometry, origin and monitoring of near-UV solar radiation (which drives Earth's upper atmospheric dynamics and global climate), coupling of the solar photosphere to chromosphere and corona, in-situ characterisations of the space environment around Earth by measuring energetic particle fluxes and magnetic fields of the solar wind and solar magnetic storms that have adverse effects on space and ground-based technologies.

Aditya-L1 will be able to provide observations of Sun's photosphere, chromosphere and corona. In addition, an instrument will study the solar energetic particles' flux reaching the L1 orbit, while a magnetometer payload will measure the variation in magnetic field strength at the halo orbit around L1. These payloads have to be placed outside the interference from the Earth's magnetic field and hence could not have been useful in the low Earth orbit as proposed on the original Aditya mission concept.

One of the major unsolved issues in the field of solar physics is that the upper atmosphere of the Sun is  hot whereas the lower atmosphere is just . In addition, it is not understood how exactly the Sun's radiation affects the dynamics of the Earth's atmosphere on shorter as well as on longer time scale. The mission will obtain near simultaneous images of the different layers of the Sun's atmosphere, which reveal the ways in which the energy may be channeled and transferred from one layer to another. Thus the Aditya-L1 mission will enable a comprehensive understanding of the dynamical processes of the Sun and address some of the outstanding problems in solar physics and heliophysics.

Payloads 
 Visible Emission Line Coronagraph (VELC): The coronagraph creates an artificial total solar eclipse in space by blocking the sunlight by an occultor. This telescope will have capabilities of spectral imaging of the corona in visible and infra-red wavelengths. The objectives are to study the diagnostic parameters of solar corona and dynamics and origin of coronal mass ejections (using three visible and one infra-red channels); magnetic field measurements of the solar corona down to tens of Gauss. Additional objectives are to determine why the solar atmosphere is so hot, and how the changes in the Sun can affect space weather and Earth's climate.
 PI Institute: Indian Institute of Astrophysics (IIA)

 Solar Ultraviolet Imaging Telescope (SUIT): SUIT will observe the Sun between 200-400 nm wavelength range and it will provide full disk images of different layers of the solar atmosphere by making use of 11 filters. The Sun has never been observed from space in this wavelength range. The spacecraft being at the first Lagrange point, SUIT shall be observing the Sun continuously without interruption. The instrument is being developed under the leadership of A. N. Ramaprakash and Durgesh Tripathi from Inter-University Centre for Astronomy and Astrophysics (IUCAA) at Pune, in collaboration with ISRO and other institutes.
 PI Institute: Inter-University Centre for Astronomy and Astrophysics (IUCAA), Pune
 Co-I Institutes: Indian Institute of Astrophysics (IIA), Center of Excellence in Space Sciences India (CESSI)-IISER Kolkata.

 Aditya Solar wind Particle Experiment (ASPEX): To study the variation and properties of the solar wind as well as its distribution and spectral characteristics. 
 PI Institute: Physical Research Laboratory (PRL)

 Plasma Analyser Package for Aditya (PAPA): To understand the composition of solar wind and its energy distribution. 
 PI Institute: Space Physics Laboratory (SPL), VSSC

 Solar Low Energy X-ray Spectrometer (SoLEXS): To monitor the X-ray flares for studying the enigmatic coronal heating mechanism of the solar corona. 
 PI Institute: ISRO Satellite centre (ISAC)

 High Energy L1 Orbiting X-ray Spectrometer (HEL1OS): To observe the dynamic events in the solar corona and provide an estimate of the energy used to accelerate the solar energetic particles during the eruptive events. 
 PI Institutes: ISRO Satellite Centre (ISAC) and Udaipur Solar Observatory (USO), PRL

 Magnetometer: To measure the magnitude and nature of the interplanetary magnetic field. 
 PI Institute: Space Physics Laboratory (SPL) and VSSC, Laboratory for Electro-Optics Systems (LEOS) and ISAC

See also 

 Lagrange point
 Solar space missions
 Solar Orbiter

References

External links 
 

Satellites of India
2023 in spaceflight
2023 in India
Missions to the Sun